The Amateur Athletic Association of England or AAA (pronounced 'three As') is the oldest national governing body for athletics in the world, having been established on 24 April 1880. Historically it effectively oversaw athletics throughout Britain and Ireland (until 1923). Its role changed to support regional athletic clubs within England alone. This role was effectively taken over by England Athletics in 2005 and the Amateur Athletic Association of England was absorbed into that organisation. It is now concerned with the development of young athletes and has taken on the role of safeguarding the history of the sport and still awards trophies to elite athletes.

History 
 Three men from Oxford University, Clement Jackson, Montague Shearman and Bernhard Wise, were responsible for the founding of the Amateur Athletic Association which succeeded the Amateur Athletic Club ("AAC") in 1880. The Amateur Athletic Club had had a narrow definition of 'amateur' and had drafted into its original constitution what has been termed a 'mechanics clause' that effectively prevented anyone engaged in manual labour from joining on the assumption that those who engaged in such physical work might have a competitive edge. This caused debate and unease from the beginning and by 1879, the Northern Athletics Association, whose membership was wider than that of its southern counterparts, threatened to boycott the AAC's annual championships. This caused the AAC to collapse and in 1880 the Amateur Athletic Association was formed, with rules that ensured any genuine amateur could join irrespective of their occupation or social class. The AAA's original motto was in Ancient Greek and read 'ΤΑΧΥΤΛΣ ΠΟΔΩΝ ΑΚΜΑΙ ΤΊΣΧΥΟΣ' which translates to 'Fast Feet and Strength'. The first AAA Championships were held on the 3 July 1880 at Lillie Bridge. Dame Marea Hartman was the first woman president of the AAA when she was appointed in 1991. The AAA of England was formed in 1991 following the merger of the previous AAA and the Women's Amateur Athletic Association (formed in 1922). The WAAA held the first WAAA Championships in 1923. It is now headquartered in Wincham in Cheshire West and Chester, towards the east of Northwich.

The AAA Championships (widely regarded as the de facto British national championships) were held annually from 3 July 1880 up to 2006 (with breaks for the two world wars). Trials events for the British teams for the Olympics, World Championships in Athletics, European Athletics Championships and Commonwealth Games were often included as part of the competitions. The AAA Indoor Championships served a similar role from its creation in 1935. The creation in 1999 of a new national governing body for athletics, UK Athletics, signaled the waning influence of  the AAA and its championships, with the new body running its own British Athletics Championships and trials events indoors and outdoors from 2007 onwards.

Archives 
Archives of the Amateur Athletic Association of England are held at the Cadbury Research Library, University of Birmingham. Archives of the Women's Amateur Athletic Association are also held at the Cadbury Research Library, University of Birmingham.

See also
England Athletics - the parent organisation since 2005
Amateur Athletic Union, American equivalent
Irish Amateur Athletic Association Irish offshoot, later to merge into the Athletics Association of Ireland

References

External links
Official website
AAA and WAAA Championships complete medallists from 1880
AAA Championships medallists from 1960, including women
United States 1879 to 1888: National Association of Amateur Athletes of America

Amateur sport in the United Kingdom
Athletics in England
National governing bodies for athletics
Organisations based in Cheshire
1880 establishments in England
Sport in Cheshire
Sports organizations established in 1880